Azadpur is one of the districts located in North Delhi India at Alipur Road near Delhi University pincode is 110033. It is adjoining to the Model Town, Kingsway Camp, GTB Nagar, and Shalimar Bagh. It falls under the parliamentary constituency of Adarsh Nagar.

Public transportation
Azadpur metro station of Delhi Metro Yellow Line and Pink Line is the nearest one here. Apart from it, DTC buses and Delhi Metro Feeders are available here for its nearby locations.

Recognized places
 Azadpur Mandi – largest vegetable and fruit market of Asia.
 Railway station of Northern Railways.

References

North Delhi district